David Rikl and Michiel Schapers were the defending champions, but Schapers did not participate this year.  Rikl partnered Vicente Solves, losing in the first round.

Mike Bauer and João Cunha Silva won the title, defeating Mark Koevermans and Tobias Svantesson 6–3, 6–4 in the final.

Seeds

  Mark Koevermans /  Tobias Svantesson (final)
  Johan Donar /  Ola Jonsson (first round)
  Rikard Bergh /  Richard Matuszewski (semifinals)
  Brad Gilbert /  Tom Kempers (first round)

Draw

Draw

External links
Draw

Tel Aviv Open
1992 ATP Tour